HNoMS Valkyrien has the pennant number A535 and is the present support vessel for the Royal Norwegian Navy Coastal Combat Flotilla. Valkyrien was built as a civilian supply vessel in 1981. She was bought by the RNoN in 1994. Command was assumed on 4 February 1994. The ship also had towing and anchor handling capacities. As a civilian ship she had a crew of 11. Today she has a crew of about 20-25.

References

1981 ships
Auxiliary ships of the Royal Norwegian Navy
Ships built in Ulstein